Henry J. Herzog (March 5, 1848 – February 12, 1935) was an American businessman and politician.

Herzog was born in Germany. In 1849, Herzog and his family emigrated to the United States and settled in Racine, Wisconsin. Herzog was a farmer and lived in the town of Mount Pleasant, Wisconsin and was in the insurance business. He served on the Racine County Board of Supervisors and was president of the county board. Herzog served in the Wisconsin State Assembly in 1915 and 1916 and was a Democrat. Herzog died at his daughter's home in Racine, Wisconsin.

Notes

External links

1848 births
1935 deaths
German emigrants to the United States
People from Racine, Wisconsin
Businesspeople from Wisconsin
Farmers from Wisconsin
County supervisors in Wisconsin
People from Mount Pleasant, Wisconsin
Democratic Party members of the Wisconsin State Assembly